Jason Metsa (born July 17, 1980) is an American politician, a former member of the Minnesota House of Representatives, and the former Deputy Commissioner at the Iron Range Resources and Rehabilitation Board. A member of the Minnesota Democratic–Farmer–Labor Party (DFL), he represented District 6B in northeastern Minnesota from 2013 to 2019.

Education
Metsa attended Mesabi Range Community and Technical College, graduating with an A.A.

Minnesota House of Representatives
Metsa was first elected to the Minnesota House of Representatives in 2012.

Minnesota’s 8th District Congressional Campaign
Metsa was a Democratic candidate for Minnesota's 8th Congressional District in the U.S. House. Metsa lost the primary on August 14, 2018.

IRRRB
On February 22, 2019, Metsa became the Deputy Commissioner of the Iron Range Resources and Rehabilitation Board. His predecessor was Mary Finnegan.

Personal life
Metsa and his wife, Amanda, have one child.

References

External links

1980 births
Living people
Democratic Party members of the Minnesota House of Representatives
People from Virginia, Minnesota
21st-century American politicians